WEBL (95.3 FM, "95.3 The Rebel") is a country music station licensed to Coldwater, Mississippi, United States, and serves the Memphis, Tennessee, area.

History
The station began broadcasting in 1976, holding the call sign WVIM-FM, and aired a Gospel music format. It was owned by Tate & DeSoto County Broadcasting. It later aired a Christian contemporary format and was branded "Victory 95.3". Spanish language music aired overnights.

In 2004, the station was sold to First Broadcasting Investment Partners for $2.1 million. It adopted an oldies format and was branded "Oldies 95.3". It was later branded "Flash 95-3". In early 2008, the station adopted a country format as "95.3 The Rebel". Its call sign was changed to WEBL on January 18, 2013. Effective September 20, 2018, WEBL was sold to North Mississippi Media Group for $900,000.

References

External links
 95.3 The Rebel's website

EBL
Country radio stations in the United States
Radio stations established in 1976
1976 establishments in Mississippi
Hernando, Mississippi